Leonardo Mansueti was an Italian Dominican and librarian.

He was nominated Master of the Sacred Palace by Pope Paul II in 1465.

He was Master General of the Dominican Order (1474–1480).

Italian Dominicans
15th-century Italian Christian monks
Italian librarians
Year of birth missing
Year of death missing
Masters of the Order of Preachers